Hajinski is a surname. Notable people with the surname include:

Isa bey Hajinski, Azerbaijani oil magnate
Isgandar bey Hajinski, Azerbaijani historian
Jamo bey Hajinski, Azerbaijani publicist, theater critic, State Controller and Minister of Transportation, Postal Service and Telegraph of Azerbaijan Democratic Republic
Mammad Hasan Hajinski, Azerbaijani statesman and architect
Mehdi bey Hajinski, Azerbaijani actor and State Controller within the third cabinet of Azerbaijan Democratic Republic